Lucy Raven (born 1977) is an American artist. Raven's work is multidisciplinary and includes photography, installation, sound, animation and performative lectures.

Early life
Raven was born in Tucson, Arizona in 1977. She holds two degrees from the University of Arizona Tucson: a BFA in studio art, and a Bachelor of Arts in art history. In 2008 she received a MFA degree from Bard College. In 2016 Raven took a position as assistant professor at Cooper Union School of Art.

Work
She has received awards her work including the Artadia Award in San Francisco. In 2010 she had a solo show at the Nevada Museum of Art. Raven's work is included in the collections of the Whitney Museum of American Art, the Chicago Video Data Bank and the Guggenheim Museum, New York.

In 2017 she won the “Kunst am Bau” (Art in Architecture) competition to install an artwork in the  Bauhaus Museum Dessau. Also in 2017 she performed in her film, Subterrestrial Cinema. It was performed at the Guggenheim Museum where she used some of the museum's materials to bring to light the museum's unknown expertise in non-objective film. 

Raven's 2014 work Curtains shows the connection between modern day movie making and location and space.

References

1977 births
21st-century American women artists
Living people
Artists from Phoenix, Arizona
21st-century American artists
American installation artists
American women installation artists
American video artists
American women video artists
University of Arizona alumni
Bard College alumni
Cooper Union faculty